is a Japanese footballer who plays for Kataller Toyama.

Club statistics
Updated to 23 February 2016.

References

External links

 
Profile at V-Varen Nagasaki

1991 births
Living people
Komazawa University alumni
Association football people from Tokyo Metropolis
People from Fuchū, Tokyo
Japanese footballers
J2 League players
J3 League players
V-Varen Nagasaki players
AC Nagano Parceiro players
Thespakusatsu Gunma players
Kataller Toyama players
Association football midfielders